Nanai may refer to:
The Nanai people of northeastern Asia
Nanai language, the native language of the Nanai people
 Joshua Nanai (born 2002), New Zealand record producer known professionally as Jawsh 685
 Nanai/Nanaya, a Mesopotamian deity